Ghasem Zaghinejad (born 14 March 1955 in Isfahan) is an Iranian football manager who is currently assistant manager of Sepahan. He was appointed as the head coach of Sepahan until the end of the season on 22 April 2016 after resignation of Igor Štimac. Previously, he was the assistant coach of the club under Štimac and former manager, Hossein Faraki. He was also in the same position from 2009 until 2011 under head coach Amir Ghalenoei. He is a former player of Sepahan and led the club's B team, Sepahan Novin for the years and help the club to secure multiple promotions.

Statistics

References

Living people
1955 births
Sportspeople from Isfahan
Iranian football managers
Iranian footballers
Sepahan S.C. footballers
Sepahan S.C. managers
Association football midfielders